Broxbourne Rowing Club is a rowing club on the River Lea, based at Old Nazeing Road, Broxbourne, Hertfordshire.

History
formed in 1847 Broxbourne rowing club is one of the oldest rowing clubs in the country. The club is affiliated to British Rowing and the facilities include a gymnasium, club house and bar and run squads for senior rowers, masters and juniors in addition to beginners and recreational rowers. 

The club has very active junior, senior and masters squads and has produced several British champions, GB squad members and Olympians.

Honours

British champions

References

Sport in Hertfordshire
Rowing clubs in England
Broxbourne